"Goodness Gracious" is a song by English singer Ellie Goulding from Halcyon Days (2013), the reissue of her second studio album, Halcyon (2012). The song was written by Greg Kurstin, Goulding and Nate Ruess. It was released on 21 February 2014 as the third and final single from the reissue.

Background
Goulding explained the meaning behind "Goodness Gracious" to Rolling Stone, saying, "I've been in situations where I knew someone wasn't right for me, yet I kept bringing them back", adding that the song "is about dissing yourself for not thinking straight and not being fair."

Commercial performance
After entering the UK Singles Chart at number 124, "Goodness Gracious" climbed to number 86 with 2,867 copies sold. The song rose to number 49 the following week, selling 5,061 copies. In its fourth week on the chart, the single sold 7,254 copies to climb to number 36. In its sixth week, "Goodness Gracious" jumped from number 26 to number 16 with sales of 16,233 copies, becoming Goulding's tenth UK top-20 entry.

Music video
Goulding unveiled a teaser trailer for the music video for "Goodness Gracious" on 31 December 2013. The video, directed by Kinga Burza, was filmed on location in Los Angeles, and premiered on 5 January 2014.

Track listings

Credits and personnel
Credits adapted from the liner notes of Halcyon Days.

Recording
 Vocals recorded at British Grove Studios (London, England) and Echo Studios (Los Angeles, California)
 Mixed at MixStar Studios (Virginia Beach, Virginia)
 Mastered at Whitfield Mastering (London, England)

Personnel
 Ellie Goulding – vocals
 Joe Kearns – vocal production, vocal engineering
 Greg Kurstin – vocal production, engineering, keyboards, programming
 Jesse Shatkin – additional engineering
 Alex Pasco – additional engineering
 Nate Ruess – backing vocals
 Serban Ghenea – mixing
 John Hanes – engineering for mix
 Naweed – mastering

Charts

Release history

See also

References

2013 songs
2014 singles
Ellie Goulding songs
Polydor Records singles
Song recordings produced by Greg Kurstin
Songs written by Ellie Goulding
Songs written by Greg Kurstin
Songs written by Nate Ruess